The 2006 Marion Mayhem season was the first season for the Great Lakes Indoor Football League (GLIFL) franchise. The Mayhem were announced to the public on September 16, 2005, as the fourth expansion team for the newly formed Great Lakes Indoor Football League. Their inaugural owners of the Mayhem were 4th Down and Long LLC, run by R.A. Mallonn, Fred Horner, Tim Cugini, and John Slebodnik. The team hired Tracy Smith as their inaugural coach and general manager on November 2, 2005. The Mayhem suffered a losing inaugural season in 2006 (4-6), however the Mayhem were within one game of the 2006 GLIFL playoffs. The Mayhem missed the playoffs due to the Battle Creek Crunch holding the tie breaker between the two teams.

Schedule

2006 GLIFL Standings

Roster

References

2006 Great Lakes Indoor Football League season
Marion Mayhem
2006 in sports in Ohio